Hafidh Al Droubi (1914-1991) was an Iraqi painter and draughtsman, noted for his Cubist paintings and for his approach to professionalising Iraqi art education in the early to mid 20th-century. He was a prolific painter, an important artist in the Pioneer generation, a key figure in the development of modernism in Iraq and a key figure in the development of early Iraqi art education.

Life and career

Hafidh  Al Droubi (also known as Hafez al-Droubi) was born Bab al-Sheikh in Baghdad in 1914. As a young student at the Bab Al-Sheikh Primary School, he was introduced to painting and drawing and learned the techniques of European academic art in terms of proportions, anatomy and perspective.

Although he was a prolific painter, he is mainly remembered for his contribution to art education; professionalising the art industry and developing a coherent pedagogy for the teaching of art in the early to mid-20th century.

Work

He was a highly experimental painter, at different times in his career he followed Impressionism, Cubism, Surrealism and Futurism, but is arguably best known for using the Cubist works used to depict local themes.

While his techniques were primarily based on Western art movements, he never really abandoned Iraqi society and art traditions. He sought to adapt Western art for a uniquely Iraqi audience, culture and experience. He used Iraqi themes for his subject matter, preferring to paint scenes of everyday life. During the latter years of Hashemite rule in Iraq, he took advantage of Iraq’s  social, political and economic ties with Britain to help forge a tapestry of cultural borrowing and adaptation, whilst preserving facets of Iraqi tradition and themes. Specifically, he painted scenes of Baghdad, its streets, its markets and its people; to the extent that he became known as the "City Painter".

Select list of major works

 Life in Babylon, mural, formerly located in the Babylonian Rooms of the Old Museum
 Life in Hattra, formerly located in the Babylonian Rooms of the Old Museum

Awards and recognition

At the Alwasiti Festival in 1972, al Droubi was one of the four artists honored by the state.

See also

 Iraqi art
 List of Iraqi artists

References

External link
 Modern Art Iraq Archive Electronic resource maintained by Iraqi artists and includes reproductions of artworks, many of which were looted from the Museum of Modern Art in 2003 and remain missing. These works are not accessible in any other reliable public source. 

1914 births
1991 deaths
Artists from Baghdad
Iraqi painters